The Shire of Kilmore was a local government area about  north of Melbourne, the state capital of Victoria, Australia.

History

Kilmore was first incorporated as a road district on 15 July 1856. It became a borough in 1863 and a shire on 24 December 1874. It was redefined on 1 October 1890. On 28 May 1958, it annexed parts of the Shire of Romsey.

On 20 January 1995, the Shire of Kilmore was abolished, and was merged into the Shire of Mitchell, which was created earlier in November 1994 after the merger of the Rural City of Seymour, the Shires of Broadford and Pyalong, and parts of the Shire of McIvor.

Wards

The Shire of Kilmore was divided into four ridings, each of which elected three councillors:
 Wallan Riding
 Bylands & Glenburnie Riding
 Willowmavin & Moranding Riding
 Kilmore Riding

Towns and localities
 Beveridge
 Bylands
 Heathcote Junction
 Kilmore*
 Wallan
 Wandong
 Willowmavin

* Council seat.

Population

* Estimate in the 1958 Victorian Year Book.

References

External links
 Victorian Places - Kilmore

Kilmore